Tønsberg District Court is a district court located in Tønsberg, Norway.  It covers the municipalities of Tønsberg, Andebu, Nøtterøy, Stokke and Tjøme and is subordinate Agder Court of Appeal.

References

External links 
Official site 

Defunct district courts of Norway
Organisations based in Tønsberg